In mathematics, Hartogs's theorem is a fundamental result of Friedrich Hartogs in the theory of several complex variables. Roughly speaking, it states that a 'separately analytic' function is continuous. More precisely, if  is a  function which is analytic in each variable zi, 1 ≤ i ≤ n, while the other variables are held constant,  then F is a continuous function.

A corollary  is that the function F is then in fact an analytic function in the n-variable sense (i.e. that locally it has a Taylor expansion). Therefore, 'separate analyticity' and 'analyticity' are coincident notions, in the theory of several complex variables.

Starting with the extra hypothesis that the function is continuous (or bounded), the theorem is much easier to prove and in this form is known as Osgood's lemma.

There is no analogue of this theorem for real variables. If we assume that a function  
 
is differentiable (or even analytic) in each variable separately, it is not true that  will necessarily be continuous. A counterexample  in  two dimensions is given by

References 
 Steven G. Krantz. Function Theory of Several Complex Variables, AMS Chelsea Publishing, Providence, Rhode Island, 1992.

External links
 

Several complex variables
Theorems in complex analysis